The 1973 Long Beach State 49ers football team represented California State University, Long Beach during the 1973 NCAA Division I football season.

Cal State Long Beach competed in the Pacific Coast Athletic Association. The team was led by fifth year head coach Jim Stangeland, and played the majority of their home games at Veterans Stadium adjacent to the campus of Long Beach City College in Long Beach, California. One game was played at the Los Angeles Memorial Coliseum in Los Angeles. They finished the season with a record of one win, nine losses and one tie (1–9–1, 0–4 PCAA).

Schedule

Team players in the NFL
The following were selected in the 1974 NFL Draft.

Notes

References

Long Beach State
Long Beach State 49ers football seasons
Long Beach State 49ers football